Manlio Martinelli (1884–1974) was an Italian painter active in Livorno.

Biography
He was born in Livorno, and trained under Guglielmo Micheli, along with Gino Romiti, Llewelyn Lloyd, Amedeo Modigliani, and Aristide Sommati. He was a member of the Gruppo Labronico of painters that met in the Caffè Bardi.

He differed from the Macchiaioli schools who had portrayed landscapes and scenery in naturalistic light; his themes were intimate and centered on people: often portraits, but could be iconic scenes of mothers and children or just toddlers. His colors were bright, with solid blocks, more expressionist than divisionist. A retrospective was held at the Pinacoteca Carlo Servolini of Collesalvetti in 2010, titled Manlio Martinelli 1884-1974 Un amico di Modigliani alla Scuola di Guglielmo Micheli, curated by Francesca Cagianelli.

Works 
Portrait of signora Rosselli", exhibited at XXI Biennale Veneziana, and won prize of the Province in the Florentine exhibition Portrait in whiteSelf-portrait, Pinacoteca di LivornoLe monacheAlla musicaTriste anniversarioGli orfanelliLa notte, exhibited at TurinLe maschereLa vendemmiaI fascinai''

References

20th-century Italian painters
Italian male painters
People from Livorno
Painters from Tuscany
1884 births
1974 deaths
19th-century Italian male artists
20th-century Italian male artists

Gruppo Labronico